Ruggiero Eugenio di Rodolfo Colombo (January 14, 1908 – September 2, 1934), known as Russ Columbo, was an American baritone, songwriter, violinist, and actor. He is famous for romantic ballads such as his signature tune "You Call It Madness, But I Call It Love" and his own compositions "Prisoner of Love" and "Too Beautiful for Words".

Early life
Columbo was born in Camden, New Jersey, the 12th child of Italian immigrant parents Nicola and Giulia (Julia) Colombo. He attended Everett Grammar School and started playing the violin at a very young age, debuting professionally at the age of 13. His family moved to Los Angeles when he was 16, and he attended Belmont High School there. He left high school at age 17 to study violin under Calmon Luvovski and travel with various bands around the country. He sang and played violin in numerous nightclubs.

Career

Films
By 1928, at the age of 20, Columbo began to participate in motion pictures, including a Vitaphone short in which Columbo appeared as a member of Gus Arnheim and His Orchestra.  Eventually, he obtained some feature work in front of the camera, but he slowed down his activities in cinema to pursue other interests. At the time of his death, Columbo had just completed work on the film Wake Up and Dream; he was on his way to stardom when his life was cut short. Among Columbo's other films are: Woman to Woman (with Betty Compton), Wolf Song (with Lupe Vélez), The Texan (with Gary Cooper), and Broadway Thru a Keyhole.

Musician
Columbo performed seven vocals while with Arnheim as a member of the string section, six for Okeh Records and only one for Victor ("A Peach of a Pair") on June 18, 1930, a few months before Bing Crosby joined the band along with Al Rinker and Harry Barris as "The Rhythm Boys".

Columbo ran a nightclub for a while, the Club Pyramid, but gave it up when his manager told him he had star potential. In 1931, he traveled to New York City with his manager, songwriter Con Conrad, who secured a late-night radio slot with NBC. This led to numerous engagements, a recording contract with RCA Victor records, and tremendous popularity with legions of mostly female fans. Not long after arriving in New York, Columbo met actress Dorothy Dell at an audition for the Ziegfeld Follies and began seeing her. Conrad did his best to break the relationship up with a series of publicity-created "ruse romances" involving Columbo and actresses such as Greta Garbo and Pola Negri; it succeeded. (Dorothy Dell died in an auto accident in June 1934—just months before Columbo's own fatal accident.)

The type of singing that was popularized by the likes of Columbo, Rudy Vallee, and Bing Crosby is called crooning. Columbo disliked the label, but it caught on with the general public. It gained popular credence, despite its initial use as a term of derision for the singers employing their low, soothing voices in romantic songs. Similarly, to reinforce his romantic appeal, he was called "Radio's Valentino".

Columbo composed the songs "Prisoner of Love" and "You Call It Madness (But I Call It Love)" with Con Conrad, Gladys Du Bois, and Paul Gregory; "Too Beautiful For Words", recorded by the Teddy Joyce Orchestra in 1935; "When You're in Love", "My Love", and "Let's Pretend There's a Moon", recorded by Fats Waller and Tab Hunter; and "Hello Sister". "Prisoner of Love" is a standard that has been recorded by Frank Sinatra, Jo Stafford, Art Tatum, Perry Como, the Ink Spots, Mildred Bailey, Tiny Tim, Teddy Wilson with Lena Horne on vocals, Bing Crosby, Billy Eckstine, and James Brown. Perry Como had a number-one hit on Billboard with his recording. James Brown had a top-20 pop hit and performed the song on The Ed Sullivan Show and in the concert movie The T.A.M.I. Show (1964).

Death
On Sunday, September 2, 1934, Columbo was shot under peculiar circumstances by his longtime friend, photographer Lansing Brown, while Columbo was visiting him at home. Brown had a collection of firearms, and the two men were examining various pieces. Quoting Brown's description of the accident:
I was absent-mindedly fooling around with one of the guns. It was of a dueling design and works with a cap and trigger.  I was pulling back the trigger and clicking it time after time.  I had a match in my hand and when I clicked, apparently the match caught in between the hammer and the firing pin.  There was an explosion.  Russ slid to the side of his chair.

The ball ricocheted off a nearby table and hit Columbo above the left eye. Surgeons at Good Samaritan Hospital made an unsuccessful attempt to remove the ball from Columbo's brain; he died less than six hours after the shooting. Columbo's death was ruled an accident and Brown was exonerated from blame. His funeral Mass was attended by numerous Hollywood actors, including Bing Crosby and Carole Lombard, who was to have had dinner with Columbo the evening of the accident and who was romantically involved with him.

Columbo's mother was hospitalized in serious condition from a heart attack at the time of the accident; the news was withheld from her by his brothers and sisters for the remaining 10 years of her life. Owing to her previous heart condition, it was feared that the news would prove fatal to her (she died in 1944). They used all manner of subterfuge to give the impression that Columbo was still alive, including faked letters from him and records used to simulate his radio program.

Columbo is interred in Forest Lawn Memorial Park in Glendale, California.

Actress Virginia Brissac was serving as Columbo's private secretary at the time of his death and was later called upon by the Los Angeles County Coroner's Office to testify and identify Columbo's remains at the subsequent inquest.

In popular culture
In 1958, singer Jerry Vale recorded a tribute album titled I Remember Russ. In 1995, 61 years after Columbo's death, singer Tiny Tim released an album, titled Prisoner of Love (A Tribute to Russ Columbo), which he recorded with the group Clang. Columbo is one of the historical figures named in the Neil Diamond composition "Done Too Soon". Columbo is one of the three famous crooners named in the 1932 Looney Tunes cartoon Crosby, Columbo, and Vallee.

References

Further reading
Toran, Tony. A Prisoner of Love - The Definitive Story of Russ Columbo.  Bear Manor Media, 2006, 
Lanza, Joseph and Dennis Penna. Russ Columbo and the Crooner Mystique.  Feral House, 2002. 
Miano, Lou, Russ Columbo: The Amazing Life and Mysterious Death of a Hollywood Singing Legend. Silver Tone Publications, 2001. 
Kaye, Lenny. You Call It Madness : The Sensuous Song of the Croon. Villard, 2004. 
Time Capsule 1944; a History of the Year Condensed from the Pages of Time. Time-Life Books, 1967.
Adam, Beverly. Two Lovers: the love story of Carole Lombard and Russ Columbo. Createspace, 2016,  2022 edition. International ed: https://www.fantasticfiction.com/a/beverly-adam/two-lovers.htm

External links 

Good introduction to Columbo--some basic facts implemented into this article
Some reviews of a Russ Columbo book from Feral House

  Russ Columbo, from Survey of American Popular Music by Frank Hoffmann (modified for the web by Robert Birkline)
signed portrait(archived)

1908 births
1934 deaths
Accidental deaths in California
American crooners
American male film actors
American jazz musicians
American people of Italian descent
American male pop singers
American male violinists
Burials at Forest Lawn Memorial Park (Glendale)
Deaths by firearm in California
Firearm accident victims in the United States
Musicians from Camden, New Jersey
20th-century American male actors
20th-century American violinists
20th-century American singers
20th-century American male singers
American male jazz musicians
Traditional pop music singers